The Gatsby Charitable Foundation is an endowed grant-making trust, based in London, founded by David Sainsbury in 1967. The organisation is one of the Sainsbury Family Charitable Trusts, set up to provide funding for charitable causes. Although the organisation is permitted in its Trust Deed to make general grants within this broad area, its activities have been restricted to a limited number of fields. At the time of writing, these fields are:

 Science and Engineering Education
 Plant science
 Neuroscience
 Poverty alleviation in Africa
 The arts
 Public policy

However, these categories are likely to change from time to time.

Amongst its activities, the Gatsby Charitable Foundation funds the Gatsby Computational Neuroscience Unit and Sainsbury Wellcome Centre for Neural Circuits and Behaviour at University College London, the Sainsbury Management Fellowships, the Institute for Government based in Carlton House Terrace, and the Sainsbury Laboratory. It has long funded the Centre for Mental Health but is mostly withdrawing that funding in 2010. More recently, the foundation has become a co-sponsor of the University Technical Colleges programme, in conjunction with the Baker Dearing Trust.

According to the OECD, the Gatsby Charitable Foundation's financing for 2019 development increased by 40% to US$18.9 million.

References

External links
 The Gatsby Charitable Foundation
 The Gatsby Computational Neuroscience Unit

Charitable trusts
Engineering education in the United Kingdom
Foundations based in the United Kingdom
Funding bodies in the United Kingdom
Organisations based in the City of Westminster
Sainsbury family
1967 establishments in the United Kingdom